A palayok is a clay pot used as the traditional food preparation container in the Philippines. Palayok is a Tagalog word; in other parts of the country, especially in the Visayas, it is called a kulon; smaller-sized  pots are referred to as anglit. Neighboring Indonesia and Malaysia refer to such vessel as a periuk.

Cooking in a palayok
The palayok is made of earthenware, a porous ceramic material. This allows steam from cooking to evaporate out of the pores in the earthenware. Juices from the cooking food would not begin to burn until all the water has evaporated, after which the food is thoroughly cooked. Since ceramic does not transfer heat as much as metal, cooking in a palayok entails a longer time and a higher temperature than would normally be used with metal cookware.

The palayok should not be cleaned using household detergents, as the porous material would easily  imbibe chemicals in the detergent that would later impart unwanted flavors in the food during cooking. It is instead cleaned by soaking in warm water and when the detritus has sufficiently softened, by scrubbing with salt.

Filipino cuisine expert Maria Orosa is credited with turning the earthenware pot into an oven. Called the "Palayok Oven", the contraption consists of a palayok fitted with a piece of thin sheet metal cut to fit the bottom of the pot and a piece of aluminum foil placed below the lid. These metal pieces are designed to reflect heat back into the pot. The pot is heated by using a native pugon or kalan, a small wood-fired stove similar to a Japanese shichirin.

See also
Tapayan
 List of cooking vessels

References

Tagalog words and phrases
Philippine pottery
Cookware and bakeware
Cooking vessels
Philippine handicrafts